Te Reo (English: "the language") is a New Zealand TV station broadcasting programmes exclusively in the Māori language (Te Reo Māori) with no advertising or subtitles. It also broadcasts special tribal programming and offers particular focus on new programming for the fluent audience.

The channel initially broadcast for three hours a day, seven days a week, during the prime time hours of 8:00pm to 11:00pm from Friday 28 March 2008 on Freeview Satellite. It was later added for Sky/Vodafone subscribers.

, the channel broadcasts, on average, from 11:30am to 11:00pm on weekdays and 4:30pm to 11:00pm on weekends.

The Te Reo channel swapped Freeview positions with Prime, on 1 March 2023, with Te Reo moving to channel 10, Prime's former position, and Prime moving to channel 15, Te Reo's former position.

Programming
 Language learning
 Ako
 Opaki
 News and current affairs
 Te Ao – Māori News
 Paepae
 Entertainment
 Te Kāuta
 Culture
 Iwi Anthems
 Ngā Pari Kārangaranga
 Waka Huia
 Children's programming
 Pūkoro
 Mīharo
 Pūkana

See also
Whakaata Māori
World Indigenous Television Broadcasters Network

Notes

External links

 Māori Television

Television stations in New Zealand
Television channels in New Zealand
Māori organisations
Māori language
Māori culture
Indigenous television
Māori mass media
Television channels and stations established in 2008
Commercial-free television networks